Fourth Reich of the Rich is a book by self-styled Christian writer Des Griffin about the so-called New World Order. The Anti-Defamation League (ADL) has called Griffin an "anti-Semitic conspiracy theorist."

The book claims that "International Jews"/Illuminati are today's "modern day Nazis". It argues that the Holocaust changed the "Jewish psyche" and created a reactionary response becoming worse than Nazi Germany in an international/New World Order conspiracy.

The book has few elements that deal with the influence of Jews in various forms of government, although his assertion is that Jews are involved in some kind of plot to control the world. The book does however go into detail, with alleged documentation and photocopies of various sources to justify arguments made in the book. Throughout, Griffin describes the founding of many modern organizations beginning with Adam Weishaupt, founder of the Illuminati, which began May 1, 1776.

It then weaves a path through the influence of figures such as Albert Pike, who served as a brigadier-general for the Confederate Army during the Civil War. The book also covers content from authors such as Clinton Roosevelt (author of The Science of Government: Founded on Natural Law), whose ideas pre-dated those of Karl Marx by a few decades and were very influential in the "Social Science of Government," now known as socialism, as Griffin alleges.

References

External links
Books by Des Griffin

1976 non-fiction books
Antisemitic publications
American non-fiction books